This is a list of the counts of Eu, a French county in the Middle Ages. (Eu is in the department of Seine-Maritime, in the extreme north of Normandy.)

House of Normandy

 996–1015: Geoffrey, also Count of Brionne, illegitimate son of Duke Richard I of Normandy
 1015–1040: Gilbert, also Count of Brionne, son of the previous
 1040–1050 (approximate): William I, brother of Geoffrey
William Busac, son of the previous, 1050-1053 (approximate)
Robert I, also Lord of Hastings, son of William I, 1053-1093
William II, also Lord of Hastings, son of Robert, 1093-1096
Henry I, also Lord of Hastings, son of William II, 1096-1140
John, also Lord of Hastings, son of Henry I, 1140-1170
Henry II, also Lord of Hastings, son of John, 1170-1191
Alix, Countess of Eu and Lady of Hastings, daughter of Henry II, 1191-1246.

House of Lusignan

1213–1217/19 Raoul I of Lusignan, Seigneur of Exoudun, husband of Alix, Countess of Eu
1246–1250 Raoul II of Lusignan, Seigneur of Exoudun, son of Alix and Raoul I
1250–1260 Marie of Lusignan, daughter of Raoul II.

House of Brienne
1250–1260 Alphonso of Brienne, husband of Marie (1227), and son of John of Brienne and Berengaria of Castile; died 1270.
1260–1294 John I, son of Alphonso and Marie.
1294–1302 John II, Count of Guînes, son of John I.
1302–1344 Raoul III, Count of Guînes, Constable of France, son of John II.
1344–1350 Raoul IV, son of Raoul III.

Raoul IV was accused of treason in 1350, and the county was confiscated.  The county was then given to John of Artois.

House of Artois
 1352–1387: John of Artois
 1387: Robert of Artois, son of John
 1387–1397: Philip of Artois, brother of Robert
 1397–1399: Philip of Artois, son of Philip
 1399–1472: Charles of Artois, brother of preceding

House of Bourchier
1419–1420 William Bourchier (created by Henry V of England, rival of Charles of Artois)
1420–1483 Henry Bourchier, 2nd Count of Eu
1483–1540 Henry Bourchier, 3rd Count of Eu (no male issue, title extinct)

House of Burgundy-Nevers

1472–1491 John, Count of Nevers, Count of Rethel, nephew of Charles, son of Philip of Burgundy and Bonne of Artois, born 1415, died 1491. Maternal Grandfather of Duke of Cleves Johann II "The Pious" and Engelbert, Count of Nevers. {Johann II "The Pious" was father of John III, Duke of Cleves}.

House of Cleves
1492–1506 Engelbert of Cleves
1506–1521 Charles of Cleves
1521–1561 François I of Cleves
1561–1562 François II of Cleves
1562–1564 Jacques of Cleves
1564–1633 Catherine of Cleves with the following:
1564–1567 with Anthony III of Croy, Prince of Porcien (first husband)
1570–1588 with Henry I, Duke of Guise (second husband)
1588–1633 with Charles, Duke of Guise (son)

House of Guise
1633–1640 Charles, Duke of Guise
1640–1654 Henry II, Duke of Guise
1654 Louis, Duke of Joyeuse
1654–1660 Louis Joseph, Duke of Guise
In 1660, he sold Eu to the duchesse de Montpensier.

House of Montpensier
1660–1681 Anne Marie Louise d'Orléans
She sold it in 1681 to the duc du Maine.

House of Bourbon

The title was used by the House of Bourbon du Maine till 1775 when that house became extinct. It then passed over to the cousins of the du Maines: the House of Bourbon-Penthièvre

1681–1736 Louis-Auguste de Bourbon, duc du Maine
1736–1755 Louis Auguste de Bourbon ;
 son of the duc du Maine
1755–1775 Louis Charles de Bourbon ;
 brother of the Prince de Dombes
1775–1793 Louis Jean Marie de Bourbon, duc de Penthièvre ;
 nephew of the duc du Maine via the comte de Toulouse, du Maines younger brother
1793–1821 Louise Marie Adélaïde de Bourbon ;
 grand daughter of the Count of Toulouse
1793 with Louis Philippe II, Duke of Orléans - husband of Louise Marie Adélaïde.

House of Orléans
 1842–1922 Gaston, comte d'Eu
 1974– Foulques, duc d'Aumale, comte d'Eu

Further reading
 

 
Eu